1886 was the 100th season of cricket in England since the foundation of Marylebone Cricket Club (MCC). Poor results caused the temporary relegation of both Hampshire and Somerset from first-class status. England beat Australia three-nil in the Test series.

Ashes tour

The Australians (referred to at the time as the "colonials") toured England for the fifth time and ninth test series in 1886; however their results did not equal those of previous tours. Of a total of thirty-nine games, they won only nine, lost eight and drew twenty-two, which is the second worst record by a touring Australian side after the 1890 team.

Their poor results, including the loss of all three Tests with the last two being lost by an innings, were due to the decline of the key players, such as Fred Spofforth and Eugene Palmer who had made the 1882 team so strong, along with the absence of their former captain Billy Murdoch who was later to settle in England and assist Sussex.

George Giffen headed both the batting and bowling averages for the tourists, and achieved the rare feat of twice taking sixteen wickets in a match during the season, with sixteen for 65 against Derbyshire and sixteen for 103 against Lancashire. No player was to again achieve the "double" of 1,000 runs and 100 wickets until Giffen returned to England in 1893.

Champion County

 Nottinghamshire

Playing record (by county)

Leading batsmen (qualification 20 innings)

Leading bowlers (qualification 1,000 balls)

Events
Somerset did not play any other first-class counties and dropped out of the Championship until 1891.

Hampshire ceased to be a first-class county after years of difficult circumstances and poor results.  They did play matches against Surrey and Sussex in 1886 but these matches are not recognised as first-class.  Hampshire did not recover first-class status until the beginning of the 1895 season when they were readmitted to the Championship.

George Ulyett achieved the unusual feat of scoring 1,000 runs with an average of under twenty, with 1,005 runs in 52 innings at an average of 19.78.

Notes
An unofficial seasonal title sometimes proclaimed by consensus of media and historians prior to December 1889 when the official County Championship was constituted.  Although there are ante-dated claims prior to 1873, when residence qualifications were introduced, it is only since that ruling that any quasi-official status can be ascribed.

References

Annual reviews
 James Lillywhite’s Cricketers’ Annual (Red Lilly), Lillywhite, 1887
John Wisden's Cricketers' Almanack 1887

External links
 CricketArchive – season summaries

1886 in English cricket
English cricket seasons in the 19th century